Cressy is a former commune in the Seine-Maritime department in the Normandy region in north-western France. On 1 January 2019, it was merged into the new commune Val-de-Scie.

Geography

Heraldry

Population

Places of interest
 The church of Notre-Dame, dating from the twelfth century.
 An eighteenth-century presbytery, now the town hall.
 A stone cross from the thirteenth century.

See also
Communes of the Seine-Maritime department

References

External links

Cressy on the Quid website 

Former communes of Seine-Maritime